Khish Eshkan (also Romanized as Khīsh Eshkan; also known as Khvīsh Eshkan) is a village in Delvar Rural District, Delvar District, Tangestan County, Bushehr Province, Iran. At the 2006 census, its population was 338, in 82 families.

References 

Populated places in Tangestan County